Landungsbrücken is a railway station and transport hub, located in Hamburg's St. Pauli quarter at the Landungsbrücken. It is part of the City S-Bahn line and the Hamburg U-Bahn.

History

U-Bahn station 
The first U-Bahn line in Hamburg was begun in 1906 by the Hamburger Hochbahn. It forms a ring around the inner city. A station was also built near the Landungsbrücken in the slope of the Stintfang hill with 26m NN, nearby [Bismarck Monument, designed 1906 by the architects, Johann Emil Schaudt and Walter Puritz. The station, which is called Landungsbrücken today, was built semi-open, which means that the western end is roofed with a concrete slab and the eastern end is left open. The station with the name of Hafentor (Harbor gate), together with the stretch Millerntor - Rathaus (today St. Pauli - Rathaus), finally went into operation on 29 June 1912. The striking tower at the entrance and the elevated railway stop, designed by Emil Schaudt, were torn down during construction of the City-S-Bahn. The new entrance with a copper roof (designed by Hans L. M. Loop and Fritz Trautwein) is connected to the ferry piers by a pedestrian bridge. The eastern entrance was designed by Walter Puritz and was built in the 1920s.

S-Bahn station 
The Landungsbrücken station of the S-Bahn has existed since 1975. Since 1979 it is part of the city line tunnel from the Main station to Altona station. A burned S-Bahn train in the station on 30 September 1984, required the station to be completely renovated.

Layout  
The main entrance to the station has an escalator and is inside the U-Bahn station building. There is a minor entrance at Eichholz, a side street in the East.

Services  
Landungsbrücken is served by the S1, S2, and S3 lines of the Hamburg S-Bahn and by the U3 of the Hamburg U-Bahn.

Gallery

See also  

 List of Hamburg U-Bahn stations
 List of Hamburg S-Bahn stations

Notes

External links 

 Line and route network plans at hvv.de 

Hamburg S-Bahn stations in Hamburg
Hamburg U-Bahn stations in Hamburg
U3 (Hamburg U-Bahn) stations
Railway stations located underground in Hamburg
Railway stations in Germany opened in 1912

de:St. Pauli-Landungsbrücken#Bahnhof